Zoe Pilger (born 1984) is an English author and art critic. Her first novel, Eat My Heart Out, won a Betty Trask Award and a Somerset Maugham Award.

Early life and career
The daughter of journalists John Pilger and  Yvonne Roberts, Zoe Pilger studied 
social and political science at Cambridge University. She also gained an MA in Comparative Literature from Goldsmiths, University of London.

Pilger was art critic of The Independent, a British newspaper from January 2012 to 2016. Her first novel, Eat My Heart Out, published by Serpent's Tail in 2014, has been described as a post-feminist satire about modern romance. It developed from an intensive writing period when the author was 23 and lived in an unfamiliar seaside town for six-months.

She is currently researching her PhD on romantic love and sadomasochism in the work of female artists at Goldsmiths. Pilger lives in London.

Awards and nominations

2011 - Frieze Writer's Prize
2014 - Shortlisted for the Observer/Anthony Burgess Prize for journalism in art.
2015 - Somerset Maugham Award for Eat My Heart Out
2015 - Betty Trask Award for Eat My Heart Out
2016 - Shortlisted for a Lambda Literary Award for Bisexual Literature for Eat My Heart Out

References

1984 births
Living people
British women novelists
British people of German descent
British people of Irish descent
British feminist writers